The Madras Standard was an English language newspaper published from Madras.
It was founded by the lawyer and journalist Barrister G. P. Pillai. 
A report for the week ending 2 April 1904 states the circulation as 3000, the highest in the list of English language newspapers in India.

References 

English-language newspapers published in India